Dražen Podunavac (born 30 April 1969) is a former Serbian footballer.

He played with NK Osijek in the Yugoslav First League, FK Spartak Subotica, Red Star Belgrade, FK Rad and OFK Beograd in the First League of FR Yugoslavia, with Fimleikafélag Hafnarfjarðar in Iceland with Pusan Daewoo Royals in the K-League. Greek side Likhi Thessaloni and with Chemnitzer FC in the German 2. Bundesliga. He arrived to Chemnitzer in November 1999. He played with OFK the first half of the 1999–2000 First League of FR Yugoslavia.

He played with Red Star Belgrade in the 1995–96 season.

After retiring, he was the sporting director of OFK Beograd.

References

External links
 

Living people
1969 births
Yugoslav footballers
Serbian footballers
Serbian expatriate footballers
NK Osijek players
FK Spartak Subotica players
Red Star Belgrade footballers
FK Rad players
OFK Beograd players
First League of Serbia and Montenegro players
Serbian expatriate sportspeople in Iceland
Busan IPark players
Yugoslav First League players
K League 1 players
2. Bundesliga players
Expatriate footballers in South Korea
Expatriate footballers in Iceland
Chemnitzer FC players
Expatriate footballers in Germany
Association football defenders
Serbian expatriate sportspeople in South Korea